Abdur Rehman (Punjabi, ; born 1 March 1980, Sialkot, Punjab) is a Pakistani former cricketer who played for Pakistan in all formats. He is a slow left-arm orthodox bowler and a left-handed batsman. In October 2018, he announced his retirement from international cricket.

Domestic career
Rehman in 1999 took hauls of five and six wickets in successive matches while representing Pakistan Under-19 against South Africa. He was picked for the side even though he only had two first-class outings. His performances in domestic competitions have been notable, especially during the 2006–07 season where he ended up as the highest wicket-taker in the Pentangular Cup including an 11 wickets for champions Habib Bank Limited in the penultimate match of the season. He is the signed professional for 2017 playing for Newcastle City in the Northumberland and Tyneside Senior League.

He was the leading wicket-taker for Habib Bank Limited in the 2018–19 Quaid-e-Azam Trophy, with 46 dismissals in nine matches.

English county cricket
Rehman signed on as one of the two overseas players for Somerset County Cricket Club in July 2012, after the county had suffered a series of setbacks in securing a second overseas signing. After delays over his work permit visa, he played his first match against Nottinghamshire on 7 August. In the last four-day championship match of the 2012 season at the County Ground, Taunton, in September, Rehman took a career-best tally of 9–95 against Worcestershire.

On 7 November 2014, Rehman signed a contract to return to Somerset as their overseas player for the entirety of the 2015 season.

International career

In January 2012, Rehman took his first five-wicket haul in a Test, taking 6/25 as Pakistan bowled England out for 72 in the second innings of the second Test of their series in the United Arab Emirates. He took another five-wicket haul (5/40) in England's first innings of the Third Test in Dubai, as Pakistan won the series 3–0.

In 2012 he was banned for 12 weeks by the ECB after testing positive for the drug cannabis.

He bowled three consecutive beamers in an ODI match against Bangladesh on 4 March 2014 and had to be taken off for the match; he became the first bowler to concede 8 runs in one over without bowling a ball. After this performance in this series he has not been picked in all three categories ever since. He was picked by Peshawar Zalmi (PSL's Team) in draft on 22 December 2015.

References

External links 
 
 Abdur Rehman's profile page on Wisden

1980 births
Living people
Pakistan One Day International cricketers
Pakistan Test cricketers
Pakistan Twenty20 International cricketers
Sialkot cricketers
Habib Bank Limited cricketers
Cricketers from Sialkot
Cricketers at the 2011 Cricket World Cup
Pakistani cricketers
Doping cases in Pakistani cricket
Gujranwala cricketers
Somerset cricketers
Sialkot Stallions cricketers
Punjab (Pakistan) cricketers